Tân Định church is a Roman Catholic church in Ho Chi Minh City, Vietnam. 
Its formal name is the Church of the Sacred Heart of Jesus. Even though it is in District 3, the parish shares its name with neighbouring District 1's Tân Định Ward.

It was built during the French colonial period in the 1870s and completed on 16 December 1876, when Vietnam was part of French Indochina.
The architecture is mainly neo-Romanesque, but it also has some neo-Gothic and neo-Renaissance elements. It has been painted pastel-pink both on the exterior and interior since 1957, earning it the nickname "the pink church".

It is the second-largest church in Ho Chi Minh City, after Notre-Dame Basilica in District 1.
They both belong to the Archdiocese of Ho Chi Minh City.  Tân Định Church is not a cathedral; Notre-Dame is the cathedral (seat) of this metropolitan archdiocese.

Its address is 289 Hai Bà Trưng Street, Ward 8 ( 8), District 3, Ho Chi Minh City.

References

Religious buildings and structures in Ho Chi Minh City
French colonial architecture in Vietnam
19th-century Roman Catholic church buildings in Vietnam
Roman Catholic churches completed in 1876